Erik Hucko (born October 13, 1975) is a Slovak handball player, currently playing for Danish Handball League side Team Tvis Holstebro. Before joining Tvis Holstebro, Hucko has played for Sandefjord TIF in Norway.

Hucko is a regular member of the Slovak national handball team.

External links
 Player info

1975 births
Living people
Slovak male handball players